Morjampadu is a village in Guntur district of Andhra Pradesh in India with a population of around 15,000. One of the Major and great Panchayat in Machavaram Mandal.

Villages in Guntur district